Bethany Rooney (formally credited as Beth Hillshafer and Bethany Rooney Hillshafer) is an American television director and producer who has worked on over three dozen television series and made-for-television films.

Since her directorial debut in 1985 in an episode of St. Elsewhere, she has directed multiple episodes from a vast number of television series, most notably The Wonder Years, Beverly Hills, 90210, Crossing Jordan, Melrose Place, Melrose Place (2009), Ally McBeal, One Tree Hill, Gilmore Girls and She Spies, whilst other credits include Las Vegas, Desperate Housewives, Inconceivable, Dawson's Creek, Boston Public, Ed, Jack & Jill, Grey's Anatomy, Private Practice, Dream On, Castle, Revenge, Arrow  among  other series.

In addition, Rooney has directed various episodes of the American TV series, NCIS.

She has also directed a number of made-for-television films, including Locked Up: A Mother's Rage (1991) also released as Other Side Of Love- starring Cheryl Ladd & Jean Smart, Mixed Blessings (1995), Remembrance (1996), Full Circle (1996), She Cried No (1996), When Innocence Is Lost (1997) and The Promise (1999).

References

External links

American film directors
American television directors
Television producers from Ohio
American women television producers
American women film directors
American women television directors
Living people
People from Columbus, Ohio
1956 births
21st-century American women